The Myrtle Avenue station was a station on the demolished BMT Lexington Avenue Line in Brooklyn, New York City. It was opened in May 13 1885 and had two tracks and two side platforms. It was located at the intersection of Myrtle Avenue and Grand Avenue, and had connections to Myrtle Avenue Line streetcars. A segment of the Lexington Avenue Line once ran north from here and turned west on Park Avenue to Hudson Avenue and York Street on its way to the Fulton Ferry until 1891. The Myrtle Avenue Elevated was built nearby in 1888, and Lexington Avenue Lines trains began to shift onto that line southwest of this station. It closed on October 13, 1950, although the other BMT station at that location, Grand Avenue was in operation until January 21, 1953, while the rest of the line southwest of Broadway was operational until November 3, 1969. The next southbound stop was Washington Avenue on the Myrtle Avenue El, but was originally another Washington Avenue station on the Park Avenue El. The next northbound stop was DeKalb Avenue.

References

External links 
 
Park Ave El; 1885-1891 (The Joe KorNer)

BMT Lexington Avenue Line stations
Railway stations closed in 1950
Former elevated and subway stations in Brooklyn
1885 establishments in New York (state)
Railway stations in the United States opened in 1885